Rubizhne is a village in Chuhuiv Raion (district) in Kharkiv Oblast of eastern Ukraine, at about  northeast by east from the centre of Kharkiv city, on the right bank of the Siverskyi Donets river.

Etymology 
The name "Rubizhne" originates from the border wall that once separated the village from its neighboring settlement. This wall served as a boundary between the two communities and became the source of the village's name, as "Rubizhne" is derived from the Slavic word "rubizh" meaning "border."

History
Rubizhne's history dates back to its founding in 1692. He was a general-anchieft and played a significant role in organizing the election of Hetman Kyrylo Rozumovskyi in Glukhov in 1750. The Church of the Assumption of the Virgin was built in 1769 with funds provided by Count Hendrykov and his wife Kateryna Sergiivna, who were later buried in the church.

In the summer and autumn of 1861, there were peasant riots in the village following the abolition of serfdom in the Russian Empire. A German company named "Rothermund and Weisse" built a sugar factory in the village in 1850, which employed about 300 people. By 1864, the village had a population of 738 people and was home to an Orthodox church, a beet sugar factory, and a brick factory.

During the Revolution of 1905-1907, workers' strikes took place in the village, resulting in the looting of the landlord's estate. The number of residents increased to 1,478 by 1914.

After the February Revolution, the Council of Workers' Deputies was established at the beet-sugar factory, and the Council of Peasant Deputies also emerged in the village. In December 1917, the village was occupied by the Reds. The village suffered as a result of the genocide of the Ukrainian people carried out by the USSR government in 1932-1933, with 528 established victims in Rubizhne and surrounding villages.

From October 2, 1941 to August 9, 1943, the village was under German occupation, and a partisan unit named after Shchors operated in the forests near the village. During the Second World War, 51 natives of Rubizhne were awarded orders and medals of the Soviet Union.

In June 2020, Rubizhne became part of the Vovchan rajon(district) and later in July 2020, it became part of the Chuguyiv district following administrative-territorial reforms. The village was occupied in the first days of the Russian invasion of Ukraine in 2022, but was later liberated on May 9, 2022.

Geography and Gallery
Rubizhne is located in the central part of the Chuguyiv district in the Kharkiv region of Ukraine. It is situated on the right bank of the Pechenez Reservoir, a part of the Siverskyi Donets River. The village has a bridge connecting it to the nearby village of Verkhnii Saltiv, which is located 1 km downstream. The area surrounding Rubizhne is mostly covered by a large oak forest.

The distance from the center of the Vovchansk city community, where Rubizhne is part of, is 18 km. The total area of the village is 2.15 km².

Gallery

References

External links

Villages in Chuhuiv Raion